Brenta Spire is a peak in the Purcell Mountains of the Columbia Mountains in southeastern British Columbia, Canada. 
Brenta Spire is the highest and middle of the three granite spires on a cirque west of Cobalt Lake.

Routes 
The most common route is the south ridge, which can be climbed on its own or as part of the popular Brenta Spire - Northpost Spire traverse.

References

Two-thousanders of British Columbia
Columbia Valley
Purcell Mountains
Kootenay Land District